Eleoncio Mercedes (September 12, 1957 – December 22, 1985) was a Dominican boxer, who was world champion in the Flyweight division.

He had a record of 14 wins, 12 losses and 2 draws, with 3 wins by knockout.

Amateur career
As an amateur he competed for his native country at the 1976 Summer Olympics in Montreal, Quebec, Canada.  He was stopped in the first round of his opening round bout to Aleksandr Tkachenko of the Soviet Union.

Pro career
Born in La Romana Mercedes campaigned most of his career in the western United States and in Mexico. He debuted as a professional boxer on July 2 of 1978 with a win over Darryl Jones in Stockton. He suffered his first defeat when he lost by a decision in Las Vegas to future world champion Joey Olivo, in Mercedes' third bout as a paid fighter.

Mercedes' first of 11 fights in a row in Mexico came in 1979, when he lost by a knockout in seven rounds to Juan Díaz. During that span of 11 fights in Mexico, he went 6-3-2, fighting in such places as Mexico City, Monterrey and Reynosa. He lost to Candido Tellez but also beat former world champion Guty Espadas, by a knockout in nine during that span.

His first fight in the Dominican Republic was a 1982 rematch with Diaz, held in Santo Domingo. He won the fight by a decision in twelve rounds, to avenge his defeat at the hands of Diaz. Up until that moment, Mercedes' record was of 10 wins, 6 losses and 2 draws, reason why it was a little surprising to his fans when the WBC announced it would give Mercedes a chance at becoming a world champion, against two time world champion Freddie Castillo, who was in his second reign. The two boxers met on November 6 of 1982, at Los Angeles. Mercedes caused another surprise among many boxing fans by defeating Castillo by a decision in 15 rounds and becoming WBC and Lineal Flyweight champion.

In his first defense, Mercedes put the titles on the line against the British boxer Charlie Magri. In round seven, the fight had to be stopped because of a cut suffered by Mercedes, which had been determined to be from a punch by Magri. Mercedes then lost his world Flyweight championships by a technical knockout in that round.

After that, Mercedes kept on boxing, but had mixed fortunes. He managed to beat future world title challenger Alonzo Gonzalez by a decision, but lost to future world champion, Mexican German Torres by a knockout in the ninth round. Mercedes also lost a twelve-round decision to future world champion Raul Jibaro Perez, as well as being knocked out in the sixth round by former world Bantamweight champion Alberto Davila.

Death

A few days before Christmas in 1985, Mercedes was shot and killed by a policeman in his native La Romana, aged 28, after allegedly pulling a gun on the policeman. Mercedes had been drinking in a bar when he was shot to death. Confusion exists as to how this incident took place as some sources state the altercation happened after a car accident.

See also
List of flyweight boxing champions
List of WBC world champions

References

External links
 
 Eleoncio Mercedes - CBZ Profile

1957 births
1985 deaths
Boxers at the 1976 Summer Olympics
Olympic boxers of the Dominican Republic
Flyweight boxers
World boxing champions
World flyweight boxing champions
World Boxing Council champions
People from La Romana, Dominican Republic
Deaths by firearm in the Dominican Republic
People shot dead by law enforcement officers
Dominican Republic male boxers